The 2019 Red Bull MotoGP Rookies Cup was the thirteenth season of the Red Bull MotoGP Rookies Cup. The season, for the seventh year contested by the riders on equal KTM 250cc 4-stroke Moto3 bikes, was held over 12 races in seven meetings on the Grand Prix motorcycle racing calendar, beginning at Jerez on 4 May and ending on 22 September at MotorLand Aragón. Spanish rider Carlos Tatay won the championship, securing the title after the Misano race.

Calendar

Entry list

Championship standings
Points were awarded to the top fifteen riders, provided the rider finished the race.

References

External links

Red Bull MotoGP Rookies Cup
Red Bull MotoGP Rookies Cup racing seasons